Louis Burke Jenkins (October 28, 1942 – December 21, 2019) was an American prose poet. He lived in Duluth, Minnesota, with his wife Ann for over four decades, beginning in 1971. He also lived in Bloomington, Minnesota. His poems have been published in a number of literary magazines and anthologies. Jenkins was a guest on A Prairie Home Companion numerous times and was also featured on The Writer's Almanac  and on the Northern Lights TV Series.

Personal life
Louis Burke Jenkins was born October 28, 1942 in Enid, Oklahoma to Burke Jenkins and Genevieve (née Webring). He attended Wichita State University from 1967 to 1969. Jenkins married Sandra Brashear in 1963, divorcing in 1968, and then married librarian Ann Jacobson in 1970, relocating to Minnesota in 1971. He has a son named Lars.

Jenkins died at his home in Bloomington on December 21, 2019, at age 77.

Literary awards and honors
Louis Jenkins’ book, Nice Fish, was winner of the Minnesota Book Award in 1995, and his book Just Above Water won the Northeastern Minnesota Book Award in 1997. Jenkins was a featured poet at the Geraldine R. Dodge Poetry Festival in 1996 and at the Aldeburgh Poetry Festival in England in 2007. He was a Bush Foundation Fellow in 1979 and 1984. He also was honored with the George Morrison award and Loft-McKnight Fellowship.

Acting and work with Mark Rylance
Actor Mark Rylance recited works by Jenkins in lieu of formal acceptance speeches after winning a Tony Award and a Drama Desk Award for the play Boeing-Boeing in 2008 and after winning his Tony Award for the play Jerusalem in 2011. Rylance then transformed Jenkins’ poetry into the play Nice Fish, and Jenkins played Old Man Winter in a production of that play at the American Repertory Theater in Cambridge, Massachusetts in 2016. Jenkins also appeared in the minor role of Earl in the 2016 film Blood Stripe and as a therapist in the 1964 film Lilith.

Selected bibliography

Books
Where Your House Is Now: New and Selected Prose Poems (Nodin Press, 2019)
In the Sun Out of the Wind (Will o' the Wisp Books, 2017) 
Before You Know It: Prose Poems 1970-2005 (Will o' the Wisp Books, 2009)
European Shoes (Will o' the Wisp Books, 2008)
North of the Cities (Will o' the Wisp Books, 2007)
Four Places on Lake Superior’s North Shore (Red Dragonfly Press, 2005)
Distance From the Sun (Minnesota Center for the Book Arts, 2004)
Sea Smoke (Holy Cow! Press, 2004)
The Winter Road (Holy Cow! Press, 2000)
Just Above Water (Holy Cow! Press, 1997)
Nice Fish: New and Selected Prose Poems (Holy Cow! Press, 1995)
All Tangled Up With the Living (Nineties Press, 1991)
An Almost Human Gesture (Eighties Press and Ally Press, 1987)
The Water's Easy Reach:Prose Poems (White Pine Press, 1985)
The Well Digger's Wife (Minnesota Writer's Publishing House Booklet No. 2, 1973)
Will Small: The Journey (White Pine Press, 1987)

Anthologies
Good Poems for Hard Times  (Viking, 2005)
Great American Prose Poems  (Scribner, 2003)
Poetry 180  (Random House, 2003)
No Boundaries: Prose Poems by 24 American Prose Poets (Tupelo Press, 2003)
Are You Experienced? (University of Iowa Press, 2003)
Stories From Where We Live (Milkweed Editions, 2003)
Good Poems  (Viking, 2002)
The Thousands, Number One (Thousands Press, 2001)
The Best of the Prose Poem (Providence College, Providence, RI, 2000)
The Best American Poetry 1999  (Scribner, 1999)
Literature and Its Writers (Bedford Books, Boston, 1997)
The Plain Truth of Things (Harper Collins, 1997)
The Party Train: A Collection North American Prose Poetry  (New Rivers Press, 1996)
Literature: The Evolving Canon  (Allyn and Bacon, 1993)
Men of Our Time (University of Georgia Press, 1992)
The Rag and Bone Shop of the Heart (Harper Collins, 1992)
Reading Rooms (Doubleday,1991)
The Best of Crazyhorse (University of Arkansas Press, 1990)
Minnesota Writes: Poetry (Milkweed Books, 1987)
News of the Universe: Poems of Twofold Consciousness  (Sierra Club Books, 1980)
Heartland II: Poets of the Midwest (Northern Illinois University Press, 1975)

Audio recordings
Any Way in the World (Thousands Press, 2000)

Plays
Nice Fish (with Mark Rylance, 2013, Guthrie Theater)

References

External links

Author's Current Publisher
Minnesota Public Radio 2007 Interview
MNArtists.org 2007 Interview
Interview with Peter Shea, 2014
Interview with Magma Poetry
Interview with Steve Benson on Northern Lights TV Series #333  (1995)
Interview with Connie Wanek at the 1998 Marshall Writer's Festival on Northern Lights TV Series #404 (1998) 

1942 births
2019 deaths
20th-century American male writers
20th-century American poets
21st-century American male writers
21st-century American poets
American male poets
People from Bloomington, Minnesota
Poets from Minnesota
Poets from Oklahoma
Wichita State University alumni
Writers from Duluth, Minnesota
Writers from Enid, Oklahoma